Dòmhnall Iain MacLeòid (born 1943) is a writer, editor, and journalist in Scottish Gaelic. He was born in Ardhasaig in Harris. He obtained a PhD from the University of Glasgow in 1969; his thesis was entitled Twentieth Century Gaelic literature: a description, comprising critical study and a comprehensive bibliography. He was the co-editor of the quarterly Scottish Gaelic magazine Gairm with Ruaraidh MacThòmais. He was a lecturer in the Celtic Department, University of Glasgow.

Publications 
 Dorcha tro Ghlainne: taghadh de sgeulachdan-goirid (Gairm, Glaschu, 1970), ed.
 Dualchas an Aghaidh nan Creag: The Gaelic Revival 1890-2020 (Clò-beag, Inbhir Nis, 2011)

References

External links 
 Tobar an Dualchais
 A photograph of him at the University of Glasgow

Scottish Gaelic writers
Scottish Gaelic education
Academics of the University of Glasgow
Alumni of the University of Glasgow
Scottish scholars and academics
Scottish journalists
Celtic studies
People from Harris, Outer Hebrides
1943 births
Living people